The 20th Bombardment Wing is a disbanded United States Air Force unit. Its last assignment was with Eighth Air Force at MacDill Field, Florida, where it was inactivated on 10 November 1946.  It was later disbanded in October 1948

History
The 20th Bombardment Wing was activated in December 1940 at Fort Douglas, Utah and assigned to Second Air Force. The following month, it was assigned its combat elements, the 7th and 42d Bombardment Groups.  In September 1941, the wing was inactivated and its personnel used to form the 2nd Air Support Command.

Moved to England, May–June 1943, for duty with Eighth Air Force. Received its first groups in November 1943 and served in combat in the European theater from December 1943 until April 1945.

Returned to the US in August 1945 and prepared for Boeing B-29 Superfortress operations, although had no combat components assigned. Reassigned to Strategic Air Command postwar Eighth Air Force in May 1946 and elevated to VIII Bombardment Command. Inactivated before becoming operational in November 1946.

Lineage
 Constituted as the 20th Bombardment Wing on 19 October 1940
 Activated on 18 December 1940
 Inactivated on 1 September 1941
 Activated on 1 November 1942
 Redesignated 20th Bombardment Wing (Heavy) in February 1943
 Redesignated 20th Combat Bombardment Wing (Heavy) in August 1943
 Redesignated 20th Bombardment Wing (Heavy)' on 20 June 1945
 Redesignated 20th Bombardment Wing (Very Heavy) in August 1945
 Redesignated VIII Bomber Command (Very Heavy) in October 1945
 Inactivated on 10 November 1946
 Disbanded on 8 October 1948

Assignments
 Second Air Force, 18 December 1940 – 1 December 1941
 Third Air Force, November 1942 – 8 May 1943
 VIII Bomber Command (later Eighth Air Force), 1 July 1943 – 6 August 1945
 Continental Air Forces, 15 August 1945
 Eighth Air Force, 14 May – 10 November 1946

Units assigned

 7th Bombardment Group: 16 January – 5 September 1941
 34th Bombardment Group: 18 June – 28 August 1945
 42d Bombardment Group: 16 January – 1 September 1941
 93d Bombardment Group: 13 September 1943 – 12 June 1945
 385th Bombardment Group: 18 June – 4 August 1945

 388th Bombardment Group: 18 June – 13 August 1945
 446th Bombardment Group: November 1943 – 1 June 1945
 448th Bombardment Group: 30 November 1943 – 6 July 1945
 452d Bombardment Group: 18 June – 12 August 1945
 489th Bombardment Group: 14 August – 29 November 1944

Stations

 Fort Douglas, Utah, 18 December 1940 – 1 September 1941
 MacDill Field, Florida, November 1942 – c. 8 May 1943
 Camp Lynn (AAF-101), England, c. 9 June 1943
 RAF Cheddington (AAF-113), England, c. 1 July 1943
 RAF Horsham St Faith (AAF-123), England, c. 14 September 1943
 RAF Hethel (AAF-114), England, 24 September 1943

 RAF Hardwick (AAF-104), England, c. 7 November 1943
 RAF Snetterton Heath (AAF-138), England, c. 13 June – 6 August 1945
 Sioux Falls Army Air Field, South Dakota, c. 15 August 1945
 Peterson Field, Colorado, 17 August 1945
 MacDill Field, Florida, 14 May – 10 November 1946

References

Notes

Bibliography

External links

Military units and formations established in 1943
020